Emma Tillinger Koskoff (born 1972) is an American film producer. She is best known for her collaborations with Martin Scorsese, including acting as a producer on his films The Wolf of Wall Street (2013), Silence (2016) and The Irishman (2019).

She is the recipient of a Primetime Emmy Award and a Hollywood Film Award, as well as nominations for two BAFTA Film Awards and three Academy Awards, among other accolades.

Life and career
Tillinger is the daughter of actors John Tillinger and Dorothy Lyman. Her paternal grandfather was a German Jew. Her younger brother, Sebastian Tillinger, has also been an actor.

Tillinger started her career at Artist Management Group, where she worked for co-founder Rick Yorn. She worked as an assistant for actress Uma Thurman and director Phil Joanou. Afterwards she was assistant to the late Ted Demme, working on Demme's pictures Blow and A Decade Under the Influence.

In January 2003, she joined Martin Scorsese's production company Sikelia Productions. Originally, Tillinger was Scorsese's assistant before she was promoted to Production President in 2006.

Tillinger Koskoff and her fellow producers Scorsese, Leonardo DiCaprio and Joey McFarland were nominated for an Academy Award for Best Picture for the 2013 film The Wolf of Wall Street. She was featured in The Hollywood Reporter in April 2019, with the article covering much of her work with Scorsese and filming in New York City.

Filmography
She was a producer in all films unless otherwise noted.

Film

Miscellaneous crew

As an actress

Thanks

Television

Miscellaneous crew

Thanks

Awards
 2012: Emmy – Outstanding Nonfiction Special for George Harrison: Living in the Material World (with Margaret Bodde, Blair Foster, Olivia Harrison, Nigel Sinclair, Martin Scorsese)
 2014: AFI Award – Movie of the Year for The Wolf of Wall Street (with Martin Scorsese, Leonardo DiCaprio, Riza Aziz, Joey McFarland)
 2014: 86th Academy Awards nomination – Best Picture for The Wolf of Wall Street (with Martin Scorsese, Leonardo DiCaprio, Joey McFarland)
 2020: 92nd Academy Awards nomination – Best Picture for The Irishman (with Martin Scorsese, Robert De Niro, Jane Rosenthal)
 2020: 92nd Academy Awards nomination – Best Picture for Joker (with Todd Phillips, Bradley Cooper)

References

External links
 

American film producers
American people of German-Jewish descent
Living people
1972 births